Dennis John Cometti  (born 26 March 1949) is an Australian retired sports commentator, player and coach of Australian rules football. In a career spanning 51 years, his smooth voice, dry humour and quick wit became his trademark. Until his retirement, he remained the only television broadcaster to have spanned the entire duration of the AFL national competition, serving the Seven Network, Nine Network and Broadcom. He was appointed a Member of the Order of Australia (AM) in the 2019 Australia Day Honours.

Cometti retired as a sports commentator with his last game being the 2021 AFL Grand Final, which was called for Triple M in Perth, on 25 September 2021.

WAFL and VFL career
Cometti played 40 matches for West Perth. His best year in the West Australian Football League was 1968, when he kicked 63 goals playing for West Perth under Graham Farmer. Farmer wrote, ‘Dennis had just turned 19 and was well over 6 foot with the ability and agility of a co-ordinated rover. We thought we had a champion.’ In 1971, Cometti made the senior list at Footscray but, due to injuries and media commitments, was unable to make a mark and did not play a Victorian Football League senior match.

On his return to Perth, he played with some success in the Sunday Football League. He initially played for Wanneroo before moving to Maddington as captain-coach, leading the club to four successive grand finals and winning successive premierships in 1974, 1975 and 1976. After retiring as a player, he later coached Osborne Park and Kelmscott, winning a premiership in 1979.

In 1982, Cometti was appointed coach of West Perth. The club finished third in his first year, but his tenure at West Perth was otherwise uneventful, and the team finished sixth in both 1983 and 1984. Other than a brief period as chairman of selectors for the Western Australia Australian rules football team, that was Cometti's last active involvement in club football.

Commentary career

Early radio career (1968–1971)
In 1968, Cometti commenced his media career as radio announcer in Perth as a Top-40 disc jockey at radio station 6KY. Over the following five years, he worked as an announcer on 6PM, 3DB in Melbourne and 6PR, again in Perth.

He broadcast his first football match—a state game between Western Australia and Victoria at Subiaco Oval—in 1971. Melbourne station 3KZ needed a caller, and, due to a quirk of fate, Cometti volunteered to sit alongside Ian Major.

ABC (1972–1985)
He joined the Australian Broadcasting Commission in 1972 where he concentrated exclusively on sport. He broadcast his first Test match in 1973 (at 23 the youngest in ABC history) and for the next 13 years broadcast test cricket alongside Alan McGilvray. He also called WAFL football during his time at the national broadcaster either side of his stint as West Perth coach.

Seven Network (1986–2001)
In 1986 his move to the Seven Network coincided with the formation of the West Coast Eagles in the VFL. However, because of a bitter battle over television broadcast rights that excluded the Seven Network, Cometti broadcast the first season of the expanded VFL competition on independent broadcaster Broadcom in all states apart from Victoria.

In 1988, when Seven regained the VFL television rights, Cometti immediately became the highest profile commentator of VFL/AFL matches (based in Western Australia where he presented the evening news sports segment). He stayed with Seven until 2001 as main sports anchor for Seven News in Perth, when they lost the rights to broadcast AFL matches. He was succeeded by Basil Zempilas.

Along with his football and news commitments Cometti, with the blessing of Channel 7, broadcast a further 51 test matches for the Packer radio network alongside Henry Blofeld, Richie Benaud, Ian and Greg Chappel and Tony Greig.

In 1997 Cometti toured South Africa with Drew Morphett covering the three test series on the Seven Network.

In the late 1990s, he was among those to have been sent up by impersonator Andrew Startin on Live And Kicking. Actor Eric Bana was another to 'do' Cometti.

He also commentated at the Summer Olympics swimming competitions in Barcelona 1992, Atlanta 1996 and Sydney 2000. When he retired Cometti had broadcast more Australian Olympic Gold Medals than any other commentator of the television era.

Nine Network (2002–2006)
Cometti switched to the Nine Network in 2002 and alongside Eddie McGuire, Dermott Brereton and Garry Lyon became the channel's leading Australian rules football caller. During those five years he was voted Australian Football Media Association (AFMA) television broadcaster of the year five times (career total 11). Cometti dominated Australia-wide newspaper polls for fan popularity.

He read the sports report on the weeknight National Nine News in Perth.

Occasionally at Nine, he returned to cricket commentary and in 2003/04 called an Australia A game.

Return to Seven Network (2007–2016)
With the Seven Network regaining the rights to broadcast AFL games starting from 2007, Cometti re-signed with Seven to call games alongside Bruce McAvaney. Cometti also had a weekly segment on Seven News in Perth during the AFL season.

In August 2014, Cometti announced he would retire as an AFL television commentator at the end of the 2016 season. His career was commemorated on-air during Seven's coverage of the 2016 AFL Grand Final, the last AFL match he called on television, accompanied by messages of congratulations from sponsor AAMI. He commentated 16 grand finals.

Later radio and newspaper career (2008–2021)
Between 2008 and 2011 Cometti was the lead AFL caller on Saturday afternoons for 3AW, initially alongside Rex Hunt and later Brian Taylor. In 2009, he also wrote a fortnightly column and weekly blogs for The West Australian newspaper.

When Cometti revealed he would be joining Triple M in 2012, he was immediately removed from 3AW's lineup to call the 2011 AFL finals series and was replaced by Dwayne Russell.

Cometti called Saturday afternoon games for Triple M with James Brayshaw, Danny Frawley and Garry Lyon. He was voted the nation's top AFL radio caller in a national News Ltd newspaper poll in 2012.

After retiring from TV commentary, Cometti continued to call matches for Triple M for games in Western Australia with Lachy Reid, Andrew Embley,  Xavier Ellis, and his son, Mark, as the statistician. Cometti was also involved in the Seven Network's coverage of the WAFL. In 2021, Cometti announced he would be retiring from broadcasting for good after the Perth-staged 2021 AFL Grand Final. In the aftermath of that game Cometti was inducted into The Western Australian Football League Hall of Fame.

An incomplete compilation of captivating Cometti-isms 
Cometti is famous for his memorable one-liners, sometimes known as Cometti-isms or Comettiisms. Cometti himself has said his humour is derived from his days trying to entertain listeners on the FM radio broadcasts of his early career as well as teenage afternoons firing off wisecracks from the hill at Perth's Leederville Oval.

Here is an incomplete compendium containing a cavalcade of Cometti's Cometti-isms over his 51-year broadcasting career:

 Hawthorn player Bradley Hill was playing against Richmond's Kamdyn McIntosh, and Hill ran on to kick a goal. "They say it's easy to run down Hill... tell that to McIntosh!"
"Alan Didak was Stevie J before Stevie J was Stevie J."
 "Metropolis, kicking to the city end."
 Referring to Melbourne player Adem Yze: "Remember the name: Y-Z-E—terrific young player; bad Scrabble hand."
 "Barlow to Bateman. The Hawks are attacking alphabetically ..."
 Referring to Port Adelaide player Josh Carr (#9) and his brother/opponent, Fremantle's Matthew Carr (who was bumped by Josh and who also wore #9): "How's that! A two-Carr collision, both with the same rego!"
Upon seeing Josh Carr approached by a tackler: "Carr—covered by a third party."
 On a collision between Matthew Carr and former Docker Trent Croad: "Carr was just poleaxed by his own teammate. Does that qualify as Croad rage?"
"Cousins runs away from Carr... not for the first time." (A reference to Ben Cousins running away from a booze bus on foot.)
"Parker to Carr ... Sounds like a match made in heaven!"
"Walker to Carr. That's progress for you."
"Carr drives along the wing..."
"Carr...parked alongside the boundary."
"Carr in heavy traffic."
"Carr drives into space."
"It was like a self-saucing pudding. Players just waiting for the whistle."
Talking about Matthew "Spider" Burton—once the tallest player in the AFL, at 210 cm—describing him as having been born on 19 and 20 May.
Well, certainly Matthew [Richardson] thinks he's the best player on their list at the moment ... Mind you, that's a bit like being the best centre half-forward in Czechoslovakia."
A Geelong player was pinged for holding the ball by pulling the ball in under a tackle; Cometti: "Holding the ball. The umpire saw what the Cat just dragged in."
After Hawthorn's 11-game losing streak against Geelong (dubbed the "Kennett curse") came to an end: "Get the hearse for the curse!"
 Regarding Brent Guerra, who did hair-loss advertisements for The Hair Institute: "Brent hates losing, and that extends to his hair."
In reference to redhead Cameron Ling coming off the ground due to an injury: "Ling's running off the ground a little bit gingerly."
"There is no footy god—only a footy accountant."
"Before this game, I would have bet the mortgage on the Western Bulldogs, but I guess this shows that I may join the ranks of the homeless."
The ball is passed to the 202-centimetre ruckman David Hille of Essendon, with David Rodan of Richmond trying to spoil. Cometti: "He gave it his best, but that is a big Hill to climb."
"Scotty Cummings alone in the square, jumping up and down and waving his arms like they're playing 'My Sharona'."
Jason Gram had his shorts ripped off, to which Cometti quipped: "It's a stripper-gram!"
 Regarding the work of Western Bulldogs star Tony Liberatore as he burrowed into a pack: "Liberatore went into that last pack optimistically and came out misty optically."
After Essendon's Nathan Lovett-Murray had evaded a couple of tacklers: "Lovett went one way, Murray went the other and they were left chasing the hyphen!"
Rhyce Shaw passes the ball to Heath Shaw, who promptly turns it over after a moment of indecisiveness. Cometti: "Rhyce Shaw, Heath Shaw, unsure."
Just wonderful courage from Paul Hasleby. He bounced off one guy and into the path of another. If you watch that replay backwards I bet it says, 'Paul is dead'.
On Adelaide defender Nathan Bassett: Bassett's my man. He never takes a breather. If he was a postman I reckon he'd finish his round in 20 minutes, stopping only to bite a few dogs.
On the weather: "Plenty of cloud about. And for anyone who's ever called a plumber, that's a rare sight—the moon is completely covered."
On Heath and Rhys Shaw's tackling efforts: Mitch Hahn found himself girt by Shaws.
On Jude Bolton's endurance: They've finally got Jude Bolton off the ground, and he's heaving like a crazed tuba player.
About the AFL's newest outpost: "In Dubai, it's Abu Dhabi, or as we say in Perth, Abu Derby."
On Collingwood youngster Ben Reid, whom Cometti noted had played only four games and already had been to Arizona, Johannesburg and Dubai: "So at that rate, if he plays 200, he will rival Phileas Fogg" (of Around the World in Eighty Days fame).
In reference to Brendan Fevola's gambling addiction: "Fevola, Betts... That's the name, not the verb."
 Regarding former Melbourne ruckman Darren Jolly and forward Brad Green: "Jolly gets it to Green. Where's the giant?"
 "There's Koutoufides—more vowels than possessions today."
Adelaide, a miracle at Etihad! At a Sunday afternoon with the dome closed! They're home and hosed!"
 "So it's back to the old drawing board. Obviously a luxury that the guy who invented the drawing board didn't have."
 On Brisbane midfielder Simon Black: "He's like Diogenes or O. J. Simpson—he's always searching."
 On an errant shot at goal by former Richmond defender Darren Gaspar: Ahh, Gaspar the unfriendly post."
 On the eternal struggles of the tall defender: "Right now Shannon Watt looks like a man in a darkened room trying to discover where all the furniture is."
 "The way Jakovich is playing today, he's closer to teething than retiring."
 On Collingwood's burly full-forward of the 2000s: "When Anthony Rocca backs into a pack, he beeps."
 The Dockers' defence is in disarray. "Everybody wants to be Gladys Knight; nobody wants to be the Pips."
 "Hardie decides to have a bounce. Look at him go. Amazing. Not bad for a guy who's built like a pirate's lunch table."
 On St Kilda's premiership drought: "The Saints have had more five-year plans than Fidel Castro."
"West Coast are playing the Blues like B.B. King."
Luke Hodge tackles an unaware player. Cometti: "He should've heard the Norm Smiths jangling!"
"9.2 [referring to a scoreline of 9 goals, 2 behinds], that's not bad. Unless it's your cholesterol."
On a coaching legend: "There is something magnetic about his aura. Paul Roos should be covered in fridge magnets."
 On the one-dimensional kicking skills of Essendon forward Scott Lucas: "I think it's safe to say Lucas takes his right leg out there purely for balance."
 On his former colleague Robert DiPierdomenico: "That's the latest from the huddles. For those of you who don't know, Dipper is a graduate of the Don Corleone school of elocution."
 On a former Adelaide and Geelong livewire's unpredictable moves: "I swear if Ronnie Burns were building a house, he'd start with the roof."
 "Some people might say that was a set play, but if it was, the Swans must have copied it off a Portuguese bus timetable."
 On Simon Black, again: "A lot of talk these days is about 'inside players'. Well, as we saw there, if Simon Black was any more inside he'd be a pancreas."
On a skirmish between Bombers/Hawks great Paul Salmon and the shorter Saints star Nicky 'Elvis' Winmar: "Just as Winmar landed, big Salmon came crashing down on top of him. They're slowly getting up, and now I can report the building has left the Elvis."
Reflecting on his early career calling cricket: "1974, Australia v England at the WACA. The good old days. Literally. England all-rounder Chris Old finished with 3 wickets and 50 runs."
On a former Brisbane ruckman: "Matthew Clarke is a dinosaur thriving on climate change."
"Bell bringing the ball out of the back line ... looking for wide runners ... passes to Walker ... a contradiction in terms, really."
"Hay is baled up on the boundary line."
On his first meeting with Eddie McGuire: "Ed had an aura. I remember he asked his personal assistant, "Have you seen the letter opener?" and she replied, "It's his day off." I was impressed."
"Four Blues had a chance to clear that ball. It's what the French call esprit de goof."
On the "Shinboner of the Century": Getting past Glenn Archer is still like trying to tiptoe past Mayfair and Park Lane with hotels.
On the Kangaroos' pint-sized Brent Harvey: He might be the only guy in the competition whose feet appear in his driver licence photo.
On Harvey again: Three Collingwood players on top of Harvey, pleading to the umpire. I'm not sure he had prior opportunity but he's been pinged anyway! That may have been the ultimate kangaroo court.
On Essendon's Courtney Johns: I remember when he debuted he had the haircut of a 400-game veteran. Unfortunately his game didn't gel as well as his hair.
When a player was caught between former North Melbourne player Anthony Rock and the boundary fence: "Nasty situation. He's caught between a Rock and a hard place."
Regarding Adelaide midfielder Rory Sloane: "It's like finding fault with Miss Venezuela."
A line delivered after West Coast Eagles player Peter Wilson booted an incredible goal in the 1992 grand final: "Like a cork in the ocean over his head."
On Heath Shaw's famous smother on Saints skipper Nick Riewoldt in the 2010 Grand Final: "He came up behind him like a librarian! He never heard him!"
On Collingwood forward Anthony Rocca's turning circle: "Rocca comes to it ... well, Rocca, like my wife driving—needs a fair bit of lane."
Referring to Collingwood's Jarryd Blair, who was caught underneath some opposition players: "There's a Blair in there."
"In for the Cats today: David and Steve Johnson. Who better to patch up a line-up than Johnson & Johnson?"
"Ball in dispute... Lamb, now Yze, the meat in the sandwich. Really, Lamb should be in the sandwich!"
"Farmer may have an injury to his calf... hmmm, a farmer with a calf problem."
"Collingwood know they're in trouble; it's like being in the bathtub with the Loch Ness monster!"
"Spida had both his legs taken out from under him—leaving only the other six to balance on."
On Dean Solomon: "Solomon not quite showing the wisdom of his namesake with some of his decision-making."
"Casanova would be jealous of that pick-up"
"Never moon a werewolf."
Talking about Troy Luff: "Sydney just need 99 of him and they'd be floating!"
"Looks like Leigh Brown's picked up a bit of pace since moving to North. Might have something to do with getting rid of that anchor." (A reference to leaving the Fremantle Dockers, who are known for their anchor logo.)
In reference to a player giving away a 50-metre penalty after a coast-to-coast flight: "I guess he thought: What's another fifty metres when we've come three and a half thousands K's!"
"How do you beat Rehn? Where's Stimpy?"
On Corey McKernan's poor form: "He's like a long jumper who can't reach the sand."
After Matthew Lloyd gives Shane Wakelin a little slap on Anzac Day: "Whoa! There will be a duel at 5 o'clock!"
"I love that surname... Fixter. Sounds like something from a Batman movie—The Fixter. But I digress ..."
Richmond, kicking up the middle towards Ray Hall: "Richmond attack through the corridor, in this case the Hall."
"There's talk of Karl Langdon offering his services to St Kilda, as if it wasn't bad enough being in 15th position."
During a Fremantle/Collingwood game describing the dropping of the second of two easy marks: "The Tale of Two Sitters."
When Mark Mercuri went up for a mark: "And the Mercuri is rising."
Brereton: "Why do you suppose he went side on to take the mark?"; Cometti: "He probably was trying to impress the Russian judge."
"Like a Melbourne Tram, a lot jumped on but nothing was paid."
"He had delusions of adequacy."
Andrew Walker really needs to do more. "He was sensational on debut...right up there with Billy Ray Cyrus!"
"He made a typo! He tried for Bickley and he got Buckley!"
"He was like a Bombay train. They were hanging off him in all directions."
On Troy Wilson's playing style: "If it ain't broke, break it".
"A couple of big touches from Clive Waterhouse, who was battling up until about five minutes ago, in danger of becoming Clive Waterboy."
"Takes the mark on one knee, as if receiving a knighthood."
Brisbane are like a boa constrictor—they squeeze the life out of you." Camera pans to Leigh Matthews in the coach's box. "There's the snake charmer."
"Rioli Lends his weight... which is substantial..."
"Great stuff by Caracella. Moments before, Ashley McIntosh had treated him like a rent-a-car."
"Shaun [McManus] goes back to collect the ball, a free kick, and several teeth."
Wayne Schwass playing for the Kangaroos, takes a one-handed mark low to the ground against the Swans: "Look at that... I s'pose we could call that a 'Schwass-Sticker'."
"The Magpies ought to be kicking themselves right now, but with their luck, they'd probably miss."
"That's not one for the time capsule."
"Kevin Sheedy, who was coaching Essendon 14 years before Adelaide was founded. The team, not the city."
"The only change to the Eagles side is that Rowan Jones has had a haircut."
"Those Collingwood supporters look like they've taken time off working on their Phd's to be here today..."
Cometti: "King to Ling" / Dermott Brereton: "Just forward of the wing" / Cometti: Don't you start!
"That was the third of two options."
"That was a case of being very hard to keep up with the Joneses."
On Peter German: "German shepherds." (A pun on German Shepherds.)
Talking about Brenton Sanderson being a former Magpie and Crow and now a Cat: "He goes much better as a mammal."
When umpire Peter Carey inexplicably took a mark during a game: "The mark has been taken by umpire Carey!" ... "Carey by name, Carey by nature." (A reference to champion North Melbourne centre half-forward Wayne Carey.)
Umpire Ryan is clearly a Mick Jagger fan. I swear he dashed in shouting, "Hey, you, get off McLeod".
"That's Ambitious..."
 "Centimetre perfect!"

Other work
Cometti was featured on SBS in an episode in the first Australian series of Who Do You Think You Are?, where he traced his father's Italian heritage back to Italy and his mother's English heritage back to three convicts and a freeman. The show also revealed his great-great-grandmother (although never charged) may have been involved in the deaths of two of her husbands.

In 2012, he appeared in a television commercial series for Carlton Draught's Draught Pick iPhone app.

Video games
Cometti was the voice-over commentator for the AFL video game series between 2004 and 2017.

Bibliography 
Back to the Place, Back to the Time (1997)

Centimetre Perfect: The Classic Commentary (2004)

That's Ambitious: More Classic Commentary (2007)

The Game (edited, 2012)

Kick it to the Shithouse (foreword, 2012)

Awards and honours
2006 – Winner of the Alf Potter Award for that season's most outstanding media personality.
2014 – Voted Television Caller of the Year by the Australian Football Media Association for an unprecedented tenth time. 2016 – Retired with a total of eleven.
2017 – Was named the WA Sports Star of the Year at the West Australian of the Year awards
2018 – Perth Stadium's Media Centre named as the 'Dennis Cometti Media Centre'
2018 – Sport Australia Media Awards – Lifetime Achievement Award
2019 – Sport Australia Hall of Fame General Member
2020 – Australian Football Hall of Fame Inductee
2021 – West Australian Football Hall of Fame Inductee

Cometti is a member of both the Melbourne Cricket Club and AFMA Halls of Fame, as well as the number-one ticket holder for the Perth Wildcats.

Dennis Cometti is the name of an Australian punk band, named in Cometti's honour.

Poet Mick Colliss performed a poem entitled "Centimetre Perfect" that paid tribute to Cometti on a 6NA, the radio station where Cometti got his start.

Personal life 
Cometti was born in Geraldton. He is married to Velia. They have two children, daughter Ricki (born 1979) and son Mark (born in 1983). Mark was a professional wrestler (The Outback Silverback) in Orlando, Florida for six years.

References

External links 

Official website
AFL Song co-written by Dennis and James McKenna

1949 births
Living people
Australian rules football commentators
Australian cricket commentators
Australian television presenters
Australian people of Italian descent
Australian people of English descent
Australian rules footballers from Perth, Western Australia
West Perth Football Club players
West Perth Football Club coaches
Triple M presenters
Sport Australia Hall of Fame inductees
Australian Football Hall of Fame inductees